"Tusen vackra bilder" is a song written by Mikael Wendt and Christer Lundh, and originally performed by Lotta & Anders Engbergs orkester. It charted at Svensktoppen for 17 weeks during the period of 2 December 1990. – 14 April 1991.

The song was also released as a 1990 single, with "Ett skratt förlänger livet" as a B-side, and became a major hit, finishing up second at Hänt i veckan's song contest that year. The song also became available in Lotta & Anders Engbergs orkester's 1991 studio album "Världens bästa servitris", as well as the 2006 compilation album "Världens bästa Lotta" from 2006 by Lotta Engberg.

Stig Lorentz orkester & Diana recorded the song on the 1991 album "Här och nu". The same year the song was also recorded by Spotlights, and by Mats Bergmans, on the album Mats Bergmans.

Single track listing
"Tusen vackra bilder"
"Ett skratt förlänger livet"

References

1990 singles
Lotta Engberg songs
Swedish-language songs
Swedish songs
1990 songs